Nightlife.ca publishes articles, reports, reviews and cultural information on outings, music, fashion, design, art, culture and entertainment. Each month, it publishes guides to living in Montreal in four different platforms: magazine, newsletter, website and social media.

The magazine is distributed in more than 40,000 copies (CCAB). The newsletter is sent twice a week to more than 20,000 subscribers and the website has 400,000 monthly page views.

Nightlife.ca has over 75 full and part-time employees and is a division of NEWAD.

Staff
Founder: Marc Pelletier
Co-Founder: Nathalie Langlois
Editor: Martine Desjardins
Music editor: Olivier Lalande
Urban culture editor: Michael-Oliver Harding

References

External links
NIGHTLIFE.ca

1999 establishments in Quebec
Lifestyle magazines published in Canada
Monthly magazines published in Canada
Local interest magazines published in Canada
English-language magazines
French-language magazines published in Canada
Magazines established in 1999
Magazines published in Montreal